Ampara Hospital is a government hospital in Ampara, Sri Lanka. It is controlled by the central government in Colombo. As of 2010 it had 476 beds. The hospital is sometimes called Ampara General Hospital or Ampara District General Hospital.

References

External links
 Ampara Hospital

Ampara
Central government hospitals in Sri Lanka
Hospitals in Ampara District